This article presents a list of the historical events and publications of Australian literature during 1981.

Events
 Peter Carey won the 1981 Miles Franklin Award for Bliss

Major publications

Novels 
 Peter Carey, Bliss
 David Ireland, City of Women
 Colleen McCullough, An Indecent Obsession

Children's and young adult fiction 
 Jan Ormerod, Sunshine
 Ruth Park, The Muddle-Headed Wombat is Very Bad
 Colin Thiele, The Valley Between

Poetry 
 Gwen Harwood, The Lion's Bride

Drama 
 Louis Nowra
Inside The Island
The Precious Woman
Lulu

Non-fiction 
 Albert Facey, A Fortunate Life
 Henry Reynolds, The Other Side of the Frontier
 Eric Charles Rolls, A Million Wild Acres
 Patrick White, Flaws in the Glass

Awards and honours

Companion of the Order of Australia (AC)
 A. D. Hope

Member of the Order of Australia (AM)
 Dymphna Cusack
 Beatrice Deloitte Davis
 David Ireland
 Jack Lindsay
 Alan Marshall
 Stephen Murray-Smith
 Leslie Rees
 Ivan Southall
 Joan Woodberry

Medal of the Order of Australia (OAM)
 Walter W. Stone

Births 
A list, ordered by date of birth (and, if the date is either unspecified or repeated, ordered alphabetically by surname) of births in 1981 of Australian literary figures, authors of written works or literature-related individuals follows, including year of death.

 7 April — Lili Wilkinson, author of young adult fiction

Unknown date
 Alice Pung, novelist and memoir writer, editor and lawyer

Deaths 
A list, ordered by date of death (and, if the date is either unspecified or repeated, ordered alphabetically by surname) of deaths in 1981 of Australian literary figures, authors of written works or literature-related individuals follows, including year of birth.
 14 January — John O'Grady, writer, best known as Nino Culotta, author of They're a Weird Mob (born 1907)
 29 March — Clive Sansom, poet and playwright (born 1910)
 19 April — Louis Kaye, novelist and short story writer (born 1901)
 29 April — Leonard Mann, poet and novelist (born 1895)
 29 August — Wal Stone, book publisher, collector and supporter of Australian literature (born 1910)
 19 October — Dymphna Cusack, novelist and playwright (born 1902)

Unknown date
 Ada Verdun Howell, author and poet (born 1902)

See also 
 1981 in Australia
 1981 in literature
 1981 in poetry
 List of years in literature
 List of years in Australian literature

References

1981 in Australia
Australian literature by year
20th-century Australian literature
1981 in literature